John Denby Sheldon  is a British trade unionist and former General Secretary of the Public and Commercial Services Union, and its predecessors; NUCPS, PTC and the CSU.

Early life

Sheldon was educated at West Leeds High School.

Career

John Sheldon presided over a period of successive public sector trade union mergers during the 1980s and 1990s.

John Sheldon was elected General Secretary of the Civil Service Union in 1982, following service as Deputy General Secretary. During this time Sheldon and the CSU were amongst those active in opposing the Thatcher  Government ban on trade union membership at GCHQ and the subsequent legal challenge in 1984. Sheldon described the government's £1000 tax compensation for GCHQ workers as "Judas Money".

In 1988 he then oversaw the subsequent merger with the Society of Civil and Public Servants to form the National Union of Civil and Public Servants and served as its General Secretary from 1993. When NUCPS merged with the IRSF in 1996 to form the Public Services, Tax and Commerce Union (PTC), Sheldon continued as Joint General Secretary along with the IRSF's Clive Brooke. During this period of service, Sheldon served for six years on the General Council of the TUC, standing down in 1998.

In yet another merger, in 1998, PTC joined with the Civil and Public Services Association to form the Public and Commercial Services Union (PCS). Sheldon continued as Joint General Secretary of PCS, alongside the CPSA's Barry Reamsbottom. Sheldon's right to continue to hold the position of General Secretary without election for more than five years was challenged under section 55 of the Trade Union and Labour Relations (Consolidation) Act 1992 but the complaint was dismissed.  Sheldon retired on his due date 31 July 2000, leaving Reamsbottom as sole General Secretary.
That year Sheldon was awarded the OBE for his service to trades unionism.

Following retirement, Sheldon remained active in trade union affairs, and chaired the Civil Service Appeals Panel. In 2005, Sheldon was invited to lead several independent internal trade unions investigations on behalf of PCS, the FBU and ASLEF.

More recently, Sheldon attended a celebration of the 25th anniversary of the GCHQ campaign.

References

Year of birth missing (living people)
Living people
General Secretaries of the Public and Commercial Services Union
Members of the General Council of the Trades Union Congress
Officers of the Order of the British Empire
Politicians from Leeds